Uniontown is an unincorporated community in Carroll County, Maryland, United States. The community is home to the Uniontown Historic District, added to the National Register of Historic Places in 1986.

References

 
Unincorporated communities in Carroll County, Maryland
Unincorporated communities in Maryland